Sue-Ellen Case (born 1942) is Professor and Chair of Critical Studies in the Theatre Department in the School of Theater Film and Television at the University of California, Los Angeles.

She has published several books, including Feminism and Theatre and The Domain-Matrix: Performing Lesbian at the End of Print Culture.  Case has also edited several anthologies of critical works and play texts, including The Divided Home/Land: Contemporary German Women's Plays; Split Britches: Lesbian Practice/Feminist Performance, which won the 1996 Lambda Literary Award for Drama; Performing Feminisms: Feminist Critical Theory and Theatre, and many others. Along with Philip Brett and Susan Leigh Foster, she edits a book series with Indiana University Press entitled Unnatural Acts.

She has published more than thirty articles in journals such as Theatre Journal, Modern Drama, differences, and Theatre Research International and in many anthologies of critical works. Her many articles include "Making Butch: An Historical Memoir of the 1970s" in Butch/Femme: Inside Lesbian Genders (Cassell Academic Press, 1998) and corrected in "Toward a Butch-Feminist Retro-Future," published in the collection Queer Frontiers (University of Wisconsin Press, 2000). Professor Case's essay "Tracking the Vampire" (differences, 1991), which explores lesbian representation in film, has also been widely reprinted. In "Seduced and Abandoned: Chicanas and Lesbians in Representation," printed in the collection Negotiating Performance (Duke University Press, 1994), she argues for political affiliations across difference. Case has been an invited professor in residence at Swarthmore College, Stockholm University, and the National University of Singapore, and has lectured at the Rhodopi International Theatre Laboratory.

Case is currently a distinguished professor at the University of California, Los Angeles.

See also
Queer studies
Queer theory

References

External links
 School of Theatre, Film and Television
 Faculty Biography
 Short biography at Transliteracies Project

21st-century American women writers
1942 births
American lesbian writers
Feminist studies scholars
Lambda Literary Award for Drama winners
Living people
Place of birth missing (living people)
UCLA School of Theater, Film and Television faculty